Telésforo Alexander Isaac (born January 5, 1929) is a retired bishop of the Diocese of the Dominican Republic in The Episcopal Church, serving from 1972 to 1991.  He is the author of Consejería Pastoral Noutética, an anthology of articles in Spanish on spiritual counseling.

References

1929 births
Afro-Dominican (Dominican Republic)
Episcopal bishops of the Dominican Republic
Living people